The 1971 Paris–Tours was the 65th edition of the Paris–Tours cycle race and was held on 3 October 1971. The race started in Paris and finished in Tours. The race was won by Rik Van Linden.

General classification

References

1971 in French sport
1971
1971 Super Prestige Pernod
October 1971 sports events in Europe